Wengelsdorf is a village and a former municipality in the Burgenlandkreis district, in Saxony-Anhalt, Germany. Since 1 September 2010, it has been part of the town Weißenfels.

Historical Population 

(From 1995 as of 31 December):

* 3 October

References

Former municipalities in Saxony-Anhalt
Weißenfels